{{DISPLAYTITLE:C21H22O10}}
The molecular formula C21H22O10 (molar mass: 434.393 g/mol, exact mass: 434.1213 u) may refer to:

 Engeletin
 Prunin

Molecular formulas